Nadaan is a 1943 Indian Bollywood film. It was the fourth highest grossing Indian film of 1943.

Cast
Aman as Mukesh
Noor Jehan as Roopa
Masood as Anil

References

External links
 

1943 films
1940s Hindi-language films
Indian black-and-white films